Aliette is a given name. Notable people with the name include:

Aliette de Bodard (born 1982), French-American speculative fiction writer
Aliette Opheim (born 1985), Swedish actress

Feminine given names